Harmsiodoxa is a genus of flowering plants belonging to the family Brassicaceae.

It is native to Australia.

The genus name of Harmsiodoxa is in honour of Hermann Harms (1870–1942), a German taxonomist and botanist. It was first described and published in H.G.A.Engler (ed.), Pflanzenr., IV, 105(86) on page 260 in 1924.

Known species, according to Kew:
Harmsiodoxa blennodioides 
Harmsiodoxa brevipes 
Harmsiodoxa puberula

References

Brassicaceae
Brassicaceae genera
Plants described in 1924
Flora of Australia